The 2020 F4 British Championship certified by FIA – powered by Ford EcoBoost was a multi-event, Formula 4 open-wheel single seater motor racing championship held across United Kingdom. The championship featured a mix of professional motor racing teams and privately funded drivers, competing in Formula 4 cars that conformed to the technical regulations for the championship. This, the sixth season, following on from the British Formula Ford Championship, was also the sixth year that the cars conformed to the FIA's Formula 4 regulations. Part of the TOCA tour, it formed part of the extensive program of support categories built up around the BTCC centrepiece.

The season commenced on 1 August at Donington Park and concluded on 15 November at the Brands Hatch Indy Circuit, after twenty-six races held at nine meetings, all in support of the 2020 British Touring Car Championship.

Luke Browning was crowned champion at Brands Hatch, finishing four points ahead of his championship rival Zak O'Sullivan.

Teams and drivers
All teams were British-registered.

Race calendar
The original calendar was announced on 16 June 2019. A revised provisional calendar was announced on 27 April 2020 with a delayed start to the season due to the COVID-19 pandemic. All races were held in the United Kingdom, supporting the 2020 British Touring Car Championship. Due to limited daylight hours, the Croft event in October has been reduced to 2 races.

Championship standings

Points were awarded as follows:

Drivers' standings

Rookie Cup

Notes:
 – Half points were awarded for Race 3, as less than 75% of the scheduled distance was completed.

Teams Cup
Each team nominated two drivers to score points before every round. All non-nominated drivers were ignored.

Notes

References

External links
 

F4 British Championship seasons
British F4
F4 British Championship
British F4
F4 British